Lolol (Mapudungun: "land of crabs and holes") is a Chilean commune and town in Colchagua Province, O'Higgins Region.

History

During the 17th century, several Haciendas were created throughout the Colchagua Valley; they were great lands which the King of Spain granted to his conquistadores. After the Chilean Independence in 1818, several mansions were created in the Lolol area, some of which are still standing today, and are part of the local tourism.

From the late 19th century, and until the mid-20th century, the Hacienda Lolol and Hacienda Santa Teresa de Quiahue (located southwest of Lolol) were an important part of the local economy.

In 2003, central Lolol has declared [National Monument of Chile], in the category of Typical and Picturesque Zone, due to the conservation of its colonial structures, culture, and traditions

Demographics
Of these, 2,118 (34.2%) lived in urban areas and 4,073 (65.8%) in rural areas. The population grew by 4.2% (247 persons) between the 1992 and 2002 censuses.

Administration
As a commune, Lolol is a third-level administrative division of Chile administered by a municipal council, headed by an alcalde who is directly elected every four years. The 2021-2024 mayor is José Román Chávez.

Tourism

The most important part of the town of Lolol is the historical center, where the Iglesia de la Santísima Natividad de la Virgen de la Merced (Church of the Holy Nativity of Our Lady of Mercy) is located. The church has a painting of Chilean painter Alberto Valenzuela Llanos, a portrait of the appearance of the Virgin of Mercy to King James I of Spain.

Lolol is known as "Tierra Huasa" (Country Land); traditional events such as rodeos, Trilla a yegua suelta, Carreras a la Chilena, amid others, take place in the town. In the local medialuna, besides the rodeos, massive events are also performed because of its public capacity.

Santa Teresa de Quiahue
The Santa Teresa de Quiahue area is located southwest of Lolol, near to the border with Maule Region. Its principal productions as a hacienda were mostly based in the cultivation of wheat and wine grapes, and the rearing of sheep. The old casa patronal (manor house) of Santa Teresa de Quiahue is one of the main attractions; it is the property of Tomás Correa Hogg, grandson of Aliro Correa Fuenzalida, who was its proprietary since the late 19th century. The casa patronal was constructed in height due to the regular floodings of Estero Quichua. The old part of the building suffered great damage after the earthquake of 27 February 2010.

Hacienda de Lolol
The hacienda comprises lands used for agriculture and animal husbandry, an agricultural y Ganado, a reservoir of ten kilometers where mackerel fishing is common, known as the "Tranque de Lolol", and a four feet high monument near the dam erected to Saint Isidore the Laborer.

Dedicated to tourism, tourists to Hacienda Lolol may visit the place riding horses, and visit Casas patronales with lunches of typical Chilean food, accompanied by wines of the Colchagua Valley.

See also
 Murder of María José Reyes and Juan Duarte

References

External links

 Municipality of Lolol 

Communes of Chile
Populated places in Colchagua Province